Pomplamoose is an American musical duo composed of husband-and-wife multi-instrumentalist Jack Conte and singer-songwriter and bassist Nataly Dawn. The duo formed in 2008 and sold approximately 100,000 songs online in 2009. They are known for their viral YouTube videos and covers of popular songs.

Etymology
The name of the band derives from a misspelling of the French word pamplemousse, meaning grapefruit.

History

Pomplamoose's presence is primarily from videos on YouTube, with few live performances. They have gathered over 1.53 million subscribers and over 430 million views on their YouTube channel as of November 2022. Their first song "Hail Mary" was featured on the front page of YouTube.

Their videos mostly take the form of "VideoSongs", a medium Conte defines with two rules:
What you see is what you hear. (No lip-syncing for instruments or voice)
If you hear it, at some point you see it. (No hidden sounds)

On April 11, 2010, the band was interviewed on NPR's All Things Considered. Conte discussed the "glitz-free" manner in which they record:

Also in April 2010, their cover of The Chordettes' "Mr. Sandman" was used in a commercial for Toyota's Avalon series, set in an Art Deco train station.

In September 2010, Pomplamoose recorded a song in collaboration with Allee Willis, "Jungle Animal". Willis contacted the duo after hearing their cover of "September" by Earth, Wind & Fire and offered to write a new song for them. Willis also provided the single art for the song.

During the Christmas season of 2010, Pomplamoose performed in several ads in the style of their YouTube videos for Hyundai, singing their versions of Christmas classics such as "O Come, All Ye Faithful", "Jingle Bells", "Up on the Housetop", and "Deck the Halls".

In 2011, Pomplamoose began a webcast named Hey, It's Pomplamoose: A Show about Pomplamoose and Other Things. On November 5, 2013, Pomplamoose launched the second season of the webcast: a three-part sequel to the band’s early years, including but not limited to, videos, a tour, and an album (released on July 29, 2014).

Conte and Dawn married in late 2016.

On May 18, 2021, Dawn announced her diagnosis with basal-cell carcinoma and that due to her condition, Pomplamoose would be releasing fewer videos per month.

Charity work
In November 2010, Pomplamoose created a book drive for a charter school in Richmond, California, offering a free download of an album to anyone who purchased a book for the school district. The drive paid for over 11,000 books.

On November 8, 2013, Pomplamoose performed at "Lens", Mateo Messina's 16th annual benefit concert at Seattle's Benaroya Hall for Seattle Children's Hospital.

Awards and nominations

Discography

Pomplamoose (2009)
Tribute to Famous People (2010)
Pomplamoose: Season 2 (2014)
Besides (2015)
Hey It's Pomplamoose (2016)
Winter Wishes (2018)
Best of 2018 (2018)
Best of 2019 (2020)
En Français (2020)
Lucid Dreaming Soundtrack (2020)
Invisible People (2020)
Impossible à Prononcer (2021)

References

External links

 Pomplamoose official website
(

American Internet celebrities
American musical duos
Indie rock musical groups from California
Jazz fusion ensembles
Musical groups established in 2008
Musical groups from the San Francisco Bay Area
Rock music duos
Video game musicians
Cover bands
Shorty Award winners